Hungarian art stems from the period of the conquest of the Carpathian basin by the people of Árpád in the 9th century.  Prince Árpád also organized earlier people settled in the area.

Horsemen in the Carpathian basin
Before the arrival of Árpád several other peoples from the steppe had founded states in the Carpathian basin. The capital of the Huns (Xiongnu in Chinese) was Buda, named after King Attila's brother, though Priscus rhetor, a 5th-century historian and ambassador of the Byzantine Empire stated that the capital of the Huns was in the plains between the Danube and Tisza rivers. After the death of Attila in 453 the Lombards and Gepids, and later the Avars founded states here (569). This late Avar kingdom was defeated by the Franks, and the Avars of Transdanubia were baptised. The first Hungarians came to the basin during the late 9th century.

Art of the Conquest period
The People of Árpád in the 9th century used beautiful ornamental motifs to decorate both their dress and the trappings of their horses, the main motif being the palmette (see the above illustration). This style remained important in Hungary from the 9th to the 11th centuries, and similar motifs can be found in the contemporary decorative arts of the Caucasus, Iran and Middle-Asia.

Arts in the Romanesque age
Descendants of Prince Árpád organized the medieval Hungarian Kingdom. During this period the combination of styles originating in the steppes with those of the European  Romanesque produced a rich heritage, with noticeable parallels in the art of the Scandinavian Vikings and the Celts of Western Europe. The coronation mantle of King Stephen (crowned 1000 A. D.) is a particularly fine example from this period.

This king stated that "10 villages should build a church", and though several of his foundations were later famous in new guises, they all date back to the lex Stephani (law of King Stephen).

Church architecture and sculpture
In spite of widespread destruction during the Turkish occupation (c1526-1686, and see below), Romanesque churches and other ecclesiastical buildings can be found throughout the Carpathian basin. Fine examples survive at Székesfehérvár, Gyulafehérvár, Esztergom, Pannonhalma, while recently opened lapidariums at Pécs, Veszprém, and Eger display remains from this period. Ruins of former royal houses at Tarnaszentmária, Feldebrő, and Szekszárd, also show stylistic resemblances to contemporary architecture from the Caucasus.

Sculptural works from the Romanesque age are often fragmentary. An 12th-century Maiestas Domini relief, the Tabán Christ is an important example of the influence of Italian and French art in the Kingdom of Hungary.

Large-scale reconstructions were undertaken after the Mongolian wars of 1241-42. Many beautiful village churches survive from this periods, both round churches (Szalonna, Kallósd and Nagytótlak), and those with western tower and southern doorway at Nagybörzsöny, Csempeszkopács, Őriszentpéter, Magyarszecsőd, Litér, Velemér and Zalaháshágy.

Gothic art
The Gothic style reached Hungary in the late 14th century, and continued throughout the reigns of the Anjou, Luxembourg, and Jagello kings. Wealthy mining towns have built them on their main square like as at such as Kassa (Košice, Slovakia), Bártfa (Bardejov, Slovakia), Brassó and Nagyszeben built their main squares in this style, which can also be seen in several rebuilt monasteries, for example (Garamszentbenedek in Slovakia). The now destroyed monastery of the Pauline Order at Budaszentlőrinci was also built in this style.

The most renowned architect of this time was János Mester, a Franciscan brother. His largest churches are in Szeged-Alsóváros, in Farkas Street, Kolozsvár (Cluj, Romania), and in Nyirbátor. Perhaps the most famous Hungarian Gothic church of all is the Cathedral of St Elizabeth in Kassa (Košice, Slovakia).

Sculptures and paintings 
The rich heritage of paintings in Hungary originated with the royal houses of Luxemburg and Anjou, that both esteemed the earlier king Ladislaus I. (Both Sigismund of Luxemburg, King of Hungary and Holy Roman Emperor, and Louis The Great, King of Hungary and Poland were buried in the cathedral of Nagyvárad at the side of King Ladislaus.) Even today, after so many wars and so much destruction, there are about fifty churches where murals of the Saint Ladislaus legend can be found.

Renaissance 
 
King Matthias Corvinus of Hungary had close ties with Italy, and Italian influence is clearly evident in architectural complexes built during his reign, such as his palaces in Buda and in Visegrad.  A recent exhibition at the mining Museum in Rudabánya displayed the quality of Hungarian goldwork at this period in the golden forints made by Hungarian masters for the Russian Tsar Ivan III. 2008 saw the 550th anniversary of Matthias' reign, and many items from his library, the Bibliotheca Corvina (once the largest in Europe) were displayed in the National Széchényi Library in Buda Castle link

Reformation 

During the same period as the Wars against the Turks and the beginning of the Ottoman occupation, the Reformation led to a change of religious allegiance in about one third of Hungary. This time was also aperiod of renewal for churches in an architectural sense, with inner spaces displaying  fresh and delicate ornamentation, particularly in the use of plant forms. "Cassette" ceilings are also characteristic of this period.

Architecture of fortresses
The wars against the Ottoman Empire also led to great developments in the construction of Hungarian fortresses. Earlier fortresses had been built before the era of heavy artillery, but were now fortified to resist it. The best-known surviving fortresses from this period are those of Eger, Nagyvárad, Nagykanizsa and Érsekújvár (Nové Zámky in Slovakia).

Baroque reconstruction

After the expulsion of the Turks in 1686, the new ruling house of the Habsburgs brought with it the new Baroque style. Most of the early surviving buildings in Hungary today are in this style: not only churches, but also castles e.g. Fertőd, town halls (Szeged), monasteries (Zirc), cathedrals (Kalocsa), colleges (Eger) and the royal palace at Buda.

Neo-classicism
After the Age of Reform, in the early 19th century ancient Greek traditions were revived, with the consequent construction of such neo-Classical buildings as the Hungarian National Museum.

Secessionism or Jugendstil 
One of the greatest architects of his age was Ödön Lechner, who planned the Museum of Trade Art, The Hungarian Geological Institute, the town hall of Kecskemét, and the Saint Ladislaus Church at Kőbánya, Budapest. Sometimes he is called the Hungarian Gaudí.

See also
Architecture of Hungary
Anjou Legendarium

References

Further reading

 [Dercsényi D., Zádor A. (1980): Kis magyar művészettörténet (A honfoglalás korától a XIX. század végéig). Little Hungarian Art History. (Képzőművészeti Alap Kiadóvállalata, Budapest]
 [Szentkirályi Z. Détshy M. (1986): The Short history of Architecture. I-II. Műszaki, Budapest]
 [Radocsai Dénes: Magyarországi reneszánsz művészet. The Hungarian Renaissance Art. Képzőművészeti Alap Kiadóvállalata, Budapest]
 [Aradi N. (főszerk.) (Ész. N.): A művészet története Magyarországon. The History of Art in Hungary, Gondolat, Budapest]
 [Fülep L. (főszerk.) (Ész. N.): A magyarországi művészet története. The History of Art in Hungary, Budapest]
[Gerevich T. (1938): Magyarország románkori emlékei. Romanesque art heritage of Hungary. Királyi Magyar Egyetemi Nyomda, Budapest]
[Henszlmann I. (1876): Magyarország ó-keresztyén, román és átmeneti stylü mű-emlékeinek rövid ismertetése. Királyi Magyar Egyetemi Nyomda, Budapest]
[Marosi E. (1972): A román kor művészete. The Art of the Romanesque Age. Corvina Kiadó, Budapest]
[László Gy. (1974): A népvándorláskor művészete Magyarországon. The art of the great migration times in Hungary. Corvina, Budapest]
[Huszka J. (1930): A magyar turáni ornamentika története. The History of the Hungarian Turanian Ornamental Art. Pátria, Budapest]
[Bakay K. (1997, 1998): Őstörténetünk régészeti forrásai. Sources of our ancient history. I. II. Miskolc]
[Tombor I. (1968): Magyarországi festett famennyezetek és rokonemlékek a XV-XIX. századból. Painted wood ceiling and related heritage from Hungary, in the 15th-19th Centuries. Akadémiai, Budapest]
[Domanovszky Gy. (1981): A magyar nép díszítőművészete I-II. The Ornamental Art of the Hungarian People. Akadémiai, Budapest]
[Bérczi Sz. (1987): Szimmetriajegyek a honfoglalás kori palmettás és az avar kori griffes-indás díszítőművészetben. Cumania. 10. Symmetry in Ornamental Art of the Palmette art of Conquesting Hungarians and the Griffin-and-Tendrill art of the Avar-Onogurians. (Bács-Kiskun Megyei Múzeumi Évkönyv), 9-60. old.]
[László, Gy. (1943): A Kolozsvári testvérek Szent György lovas-szobrának lószerszáma. The Horse Mount of the Statue of St. George Made by the Kolozsvári Brothers. Egyetemi Nyomda, Kolozsvár]
[László, Gy. (1943b): Der Grabfund von Koroncó und der altungarische Sattel. Archaeologia Hungarica, XXVII. Budapest]
[Gombrich, E (1986): A művészet története, The History of Arts. Gondolat Kiadó, Budapest]
[Fodor I. (1996): A honfoglaló magyarság. The Conquesting Hungarians. Magyar Nemzeti Múzeum, Budapest]
[Gerő L. (szerk.) (1975): Várépítészetünk. Architecture of tour fortresses and castles. Műszaki, Budapest]
[Gervers-Molnár V. (1972): A középkori Magyarország rotundái. Rotundas in the Medieval Hungary. Akadémiai, Budapest]
[Lükő G. (1942): A magyar lélek formái. The forms of the Hungarian Soul. Exodus, Budapest]
[Ortutay Gy. (főszerk.) (1977–1982): Magyar Néprajzi Lexikon. Encyclopedia of the Hungarian Ethnography. Akadémiai Kiadó, Budapest]
[Szőnyi O. (É.n.): Régi magyar templomok. Alte Ungarische Kirchen. Anciennes églises Hongroises. Hungarian Churches of Yore. A Műemlékek Országos Bizottsága. Mirályi Magyar Egyetemi Nyomda, Budapest. ]
[Zolnay L. (1977): Kincses Magyarország. The Treasuries of Hungary. Magvető, Budapest]

External links

 
Art
Art by country
European art
art